Fred Beardsworth (1899 – 10 October 1964) was an English association football halfback who played in the Southern New England Soccer League and the National Association Football League. He is a member of the National Soccer Hall of Fame.

External links
 National Soccer Hall of Fame profile

1899 births
1964 deaths
English footballers
English emigrants to the United States
American soccer players
Southern New England Soccer League players
New Bedford Whalers players
Fore River players
National Association Football League players
Robins Dry Dock players
National Soccer Hall of Fame members
People from Leyland, Lancashire
Association football defenders
English expatriate sportspeople in the United States
Expatriate soccer players in the United States
English expatriate footballers